Afon Dulyn (English : River Dulyn) is the outflow from Llyn Dulyn, a lake in the Carneddau mountains in north-west Wales. It is a tributary of the river Conwy.

Just below Afon Dulyn the river is joined by Afon Melynllyn, a small river flowing from neighbouring Llyn Melynllyn.

The river does not carry a great deal of water because water is transferred from Llyn Dulyn to the reservoirs of Llyn Eigiau and Llyn Cowlyd.

Ceunant Dulyn
Ceunant Dulyn, or the Dulyn Gorge, has been designated a Site of Special Scientific Interest (SSSI) since 1 January 1961 as a conservation measure to protect the site on account of its wildlife. Its area is 35.66 hectares. Natural Resources Wales is the body responsible for the site.

References

Caerhun
Dulyn
Dulyn
Sites of Special Scientific Interest in Clwyd